The Eugene O'Neill Award (Swedish: O'Neill-stipendiet)  is one of Sweden's finest awards for stage actors. 
It is a  scholarship for actors at the Swedish theater.
It has been awarded annually by the Royal Dramatic Theatre  since 1956.

History
Eugene Gladstone O'Neill (1888–1953) was a noted American playwright. He was a four winner of the Pulitzer Prize  for drama and was the Nobel laureate for literature in 1936.

Just before Eugene O'Neill died in 1953, he drew up a will in which he gave the then not yet staged play Long Day's Journey Into Night (written in 1941) to Sweden's Royal Dramatic Theatre (Dramaten), along with exclusive first performance rights.  The play had its world premiere in Stockholm on February 2, 1956. The gesture was as thanks for Dramaten's continued interest in staging his plays (more so than any other theatre in the world), and for Swedish  appreciation of his work long before he became recognized internationally, or in his home country.

Later his widow  American stage and film actress Carlotta Monterey (1888– 1970), also gave Dramaten the performing rights to A Touch of the Poet (1942), Hughie (1942) and More Stately Mansions (posthumous). She refused staging fees for his plays in Sweden, provided that 8% of the royalties from the revenues of each performance were given to the Eugene O'Neill Memory Fund, which manages the money for the Eugene O'Neill Award.

The  scholarship is bestowed annually on the 16th of October, the anniversary of O'Neill's birthday. In accordance with O'Neill's own wishes, it is given to "highly deserving actors of Dramaten". Recipients of the award are decided by Dramaten's board of directors.
As an extra honour to Eugene O'Neill, the first award was granted to the two actors who played the leading parts of James and Mary Tyrone in the original staging of Long Day's Journey Into Night at Dramaten in February 1956; Lars Hanson  (1886–1965) and Inga Tidblad (1901–1975).

Recipients

1956 – Lars Hanson and Inga Tidblad
1957 – Tora Teje
1958 – Anders Henrikson
1959 – Gunn Wållgren
1960 – Ulf Palme
1961 – Eva Dahlbeck
1962 – Olof Sandborg
1963 – Georg Rydeberg
1964 – Sif Ruud
1965 – Holger Löwenadler
1966 – Gertrud Fridh
1967 – Olof Widgren
1968 – Irma Christenson
1969 – Jan-Olof Strandberg
1970 – Birgitta Valberg
1971 – Anders Ek
1972 – Anita Björk
1973 – Olle Hilding
1974 – Margaretha Krook
1975 – Ernst-Hugo Järegård
1976 – Toivo Pawlo
1977 – Ulla Sjöblom
1978 – Ingvar Kjellson
1980 – Allan Edwall
1981 – Aino Taube
1982 – Jarl Kulle
1983 – Ulf Johanson
1984 – Margaretha Byström
1985 – Sven Lindberg
1986 – Mona Malm
1987 – Hans Strååt
1988 – Bibi Andersson and Jan Malmsjö
1989 – Gunnel Lindblom
1990 – Thommy Berggren
1991 – Börje Ahlstedt
1992 – Erland Josephson
1993 – Lena Endre
1994 – Lennart Hjulström
1995 – Stina Ekblad
1996 – Per Myrberg
1997 – Krister Henriksson
1998 – Marie Göranzon
1999 – Keve Hjelm
2000 – Lil Terselius
2001 – Örjan Ramberg
2002 – Pernilla August
2003 – Björn Granath
2004 – Irene Lindh
2005 – Reine Brynolfsson
2006 – Lena Nyman
2007 – Rolf Skoglund
2008 – Anita Wall
2009 – Hans Klinga
2010 – Malin Ek
2011 – Johan Rabaeus
2012 – Kristina Törnqvist
2013 – Pontus Gustafsson
2014 – Thérèse Brunnander
2015 – Per Mattsson
2016 – Melinda Kinnaman
2017 – Jonas Karlsson
2018 – Ingela Olsson
2019 – Erik Ehn
2020 – Marie Richardson

See also
Eugene O'Neill Theatre

References

External links
Dramaten official website 

Swedish theatre awards
Awards established in 1956
Eugene O'Neill Award winners
1956 establishments in Sweden